Nathan Marsh Pusey Library is an underground library located inside of Harvard University. It was announced in June 1971 and was named after Nathan Pusey, the president of Harvard from 1953 to 1971. The library is the world's first library to be built with a halon-gas fire-extinguishing system. The building contains the Harvard University Archives.

References

Harvard Library
Libraries established in 1976
1976 establishments in Massachusetts